Madleen Kane (born Madeleine Flerkell 4 March 1958 in Malmö, Sweden), is a Swedish model and singer. A former Elite fashion model (height 180 cm / 5'11" - weight 47 kg / 103 lbs), she worked since age 17 for the German fashion magazine Burda Moden. She was published seminaked in two issues of Playboy magazine (in April 1978 for French edition and in April 1979 for Spanish edition).  In addition, she had five Top 10 hits on the US Hot Dance Music/Club Play chart in the late 1970s and early 1980s.

Biography and career
At the age of 20, Madleen was discovered by J.C. Friederich, owner of Boona Music productions.  She became a popular singer working in 1978 with her album Rough Diamond, which became popular not only in the U.S., but across the globe. After she released Cheri in 1979, her singing career took off. Madleen's debut album Rough Diamond (1978) was originally released in France by CBS and soon after by Warner Bros. in North America. It became a hit on the Billboard Dance Chart. For this album, she recorded a disco version of C'est si bon. Paris-based production team Michaele, Lana & Paul Sébastian produced the album. They have also worked with Theo Vaness and on "Argentina Forever" by Pacific Blue.

Cheri (1979), was Kane's 2nd CBS Disques S.A. / Warner Bros. release, which featured "Forbidden Love", a dramatic "pop-opus" arranged by Thor Baldursson. The A-side suite of "Forbidden Love", the title track, its breakdown "Fire In My Heart" and "Secret Love Affair" gave her another club hit, which ran for over 15 minutes. Jim Burgess remixed it for a single, which was edited to just over eight minutes. The ballad "You and I", has become a wedding day favourite in Canada.

Unlike the North American albums, the French releases of Rough Diamond and Cheri had gatefold sleeves. In addition, the American mix of "Forbidden Love" is different from that released in other countries. The track "I Want You, Need You, Love You" was omitted from the North American release.

At the beginning of the 1980s, Madleen moved to Chalet Records, part of Prelude Records, and released her third album, Sounds Of Love (1980). It featured "Cherchez Pas", which was more "electronic" as opposed to her usual symphonic disco songs, and peak #18 in Sweden. Madleen later worked with producers Giorgio Moroder and Pete Bellotte. Nevertheless, Giorgio Moroder appeared with his mixes in 1981 with "Don't wanna Lose You" and helped her album sales in Clubs but no longer in radios. "You Can" (1981), the Flashdance-esque lead single from those sessions spent three weeks on top of the Billboard Dance charts. It also got to number 77 on the Billboard Hot 100 in February 1982 and was Kane's only entry on that chart. The album Don't Wanna Lose You followed. This was again released on Chalet Records, which was owned by her then-husband Jean-Claude Friederich and distributed by dance promoter Tom Hayden and his TSR Record Company, which was to be Madleen's next record label. Other big hits: "Playing For Time," "You Can," "I'm No Angel," "Fire in My Heart".

London's Ian Anthony Stephens and Megatone recording artist Paul Parker teamed up to provide Madleen with "I'm No Angel", a Billboard Dance Hit from her 1985 album, Cover Girl. Madleen stopped her career as family life became her priority and she raised three children.

A collection of her hits, 12 Inches And More (1994) was her final release. 12 Inches And More does not feature any of the extended mixes from her early career. Album versions are used in place of the remixes, possibly due to licensing issues. In January 2010, Madleen's first two albums were reissued on the MP3 via Amazon.com.

In 2011, Gold Legion reissued her album "Rough Diamond" on cd.
In June 2016, Madleen performed in Miami at the Cafe Iguana in Miami, Florida. In 2018 she published her memoir "Rough Diamond" through Mindstir Media.

Discography

Albums
Rough Diamond (1978) Warner Bros.
Cheri (1979) Warner Bros.
Sounds of Love (1980) Chalet
Don't Wanna Lose You (1981) Chalet
Cover Girl (1985) TSR
12 Inches and More (1994) TSR

Singles
 "Rough Diamond" (1978)
 "Fever" (1978)
 "Touch My Heart" (1979)
 "Forbidden Love" (1979)
 "You and I" (1979)
 "Secret Love Affair" (1979)
 "Cheri" (1979)
 "Cherchez Pas" (1980)
 "Boogie Talk" (1980)
 "You Can" (1981)
 "Fire In My Heart" (1981)
 "Playing For Time" (1982)
 "On Fire" (1985)
 "Ecstasy" (1985)
 "I'm No Angel" (1985)

Charts

See also
List of artists who reached number one on the US Dance chart

References

External links
Discography

Swedish women singers
Swedish pop singers
Eurodisco musicians
Swedish dance musicians
English-language singers from Sweden
Warner Records artists
1958 births
Living people